Kravchenko, also Krawchenko, Krawczenko or Kravtchenko (Сyrillic: Кравченко) is a common Ukrainian surname, widely found in the former Soviet Union and respective diasporas abroad. It is an occupational surname of patronymic derivation, based on the occupation of kravets (кравець), or 'tailor' and literally meaning "child of tailor". Other Ukrainian surnames of similar derivation are Kravchuk and Kravets.

It may refer to the following people:

Alex Kravchenko (born 1971), Russian professional poker player
Alexander Kravchenko, several persons
Andrei Kravchenko (disambiguation), several persons
Anzhela Kravchenko (born 1971), Ukrainian sprinter
Dmytro Kravchenko (born 1995), Ukrainian football player
Fyodor Iosifovich Kravchenko (1912–1988), Soviet army officer and Hero of the Soviet Union
Grigory Kravchenko (1912–1943), Soviet aircraft pilot and twice Hero of the Soviet Union
Ivan Khotovich Kravchenko (1921–1945), Soviet army officer and Hero of the Soviet Union
Ivan Yakovlevich Kravchenko (1905–1942), Soviet army officer and Hero of the Soviet Union
Kostyantyn Kravchenko (born 1986), Ukrainian football player
Marina Kravchenko (born 1975), Israeli table tennis player
Mykhailo Kravchenko (1858–1917), Kobzar from Poltava
Mykola Kravchenko (1983–2022), Ukrainian public and political figure
Mykyta Kravchenko (born 1997), Ukrainian football player
Nikolai Grigoryevich Kravchenko (born 1923), Soviet soldier and Full Cavalier of the Order of Glory
Nicolai Ivanovich Kravchenko (1867-1941), Russian battle painter, journalist and writer
Nikolai Vasilyevich Kravchenko (born 1952), Soviet army officer and Hero of the Soviet Union
Serhiy Kravchenko (born 1983), Ukrainian football player
Serhiy Kravchenko (born 1990), Ukrainian football player
Valentina Kravchenko (1917–2000), squadron navigator during World War II and Hero of the Russian Federation
Valeri Kravchenko (1939–1995), Soviet volleyball player 
Vasili Kravchenko (1923–1944), Soviet army officer and Hero of the Soviet Union
Victor Kravchenko (defector) (1905–1966), Soviet defector
Viktor Kravchenko (athlete) (born 1941), Soviet triple jumper
Volodymyr Kravchenko (born 1969), Ukrainian triple jumper
Yuriy Kravchenko (1951–2005), Ukrainian police officer and statesman

References

See also
 

Occupational surnames
Ukrainian-language surnames
Surnames of Ukrainian origin